"Take Her Back" is the fifth single released by British indie band The Pigeon Detectives from their début album Wait For Me. It was released on 13 August 2007. It became the band's third straight UK Top 20 single, peaking at No. 20 in the UK Singles Chart.

The song is about age difference in relationships, matching the 22-year-old protagonist alternately with a 17-year-old and a 31-year-old.

Track listing
CD DTTR034CD
Take Her Back
Wouldn't Believe It (full version)
Left Alone (live at Leeds Town Hall)

7" version 1 DTTR034
Take Her Back
Statik Back

7" version 2 DTTR034VL
Take Her Back
Take Her Back (live at Leeds Town Hall)

Charts

Certifications

References

2006 songs
2007 singles
The Pigeon Detectives songs